A hostel is a budget-oriented, overnight lodging place where travelers rent accommodation by the bed as opposed to the whole room.

Hostel may also refer to:

Housing
 In South Asia and elsewhere, a dormitory or other residence for university students
 In Nepal, a boarding school or dormitory for resident students at colleges

Media
 Hostel (TV series), a 2003 Nepalese television series
 Hostel (2005 film), a 2005 American film
 Hostel: Part II, the first sequel
 Hostel: Part III, the second sequel
 Hostel (2011 film), a 2011 Indian Hindi film
 Hostel (2013 film), a 2013 Nepali film
 Hostel (2021 film), a 2021 Russian film
 Hostel (2022 film), a 2022 Indian Tamil film